Central Station (also known as Central) is an underground Tyne and Wear Metro station, serving the Grainger Town area of the city of Newcastle upon Tyne in Tyne and Wear, England. It joined the network on 15 November 1981, following the opening of the third phase of the network, between Haymarket and Heworth. The station is named after Newcastle Central railway station, which stands directly above it.

History
Central Station joined the Tyne and Wear Metro network on 15 November 1981, following the opening of the third phase of the network, between Haymarket and Heworth.

The station is located below , the National Rail station from which it gets its name. The station has entrances from inside the National Rail station, and from the street.

Metro serves as a replacement for some routes that had formerly been operated from the mainline station towards  &  via the North Tyneside Loop. In 1984, Metro reached , replacing British Rail services.

Refurbishment 

Between September 2015 and March 2017, the station was refurbished – a project costing £6million.

Facilities 
The station has two platforms, seating, next train audio and visual displays, timetable and information posters and an emergency help point. The ticket hall is located on the upper level, with ticket machines (which accept cash, card and contactless payment) and automatic ticket barriers, which were installed at 13 stations across the network during the early 2010s. There is step-free access to both platforms by lift, with platforms also linked by escalator and staircase.

Services 
, the station is served by up to ten trains per hour on weekdays and Saturday, and up to eight trains per hour during the evening and on Sunday.

Rolling stock used: Class 599 Metrocar

Gallery

References

External links
 
Timetable and station information for Central Station

Railway stations in Great Britain opened in 1981
Railway stations located underground in the United Kingdom
Railway stations with vitreous enamel panels
1981 establishments in England